A doomsday device is a hypothetical construction — usually a weapon or weapons system — which could destroy all life on a planet, particularly Earth, or destroy the planet itself, bringing "doomsday", a term used for the end of planet Earth. Most hypothetical constructions rely on hydrogen bombs being made arbitrarily large, assuming there are no concerns about delivering them to a target (see Teller–Ulam design) or that they can be "salted" with materials designed to create long-lasting and hazardous fallout (e.g., a cobalt bomb).

Doomsday devices and the nuclear holocaust they bring about have been present in literature and art especially in the 20th century, when advances in science and technology made world destruction (or at least the eradication of all human life) a credible scenario. Many classics in the genre of science fiction take up the theme in this respect. The term "doomsday machine" itself is attested from 1960, but the alliterative "doomsday device" has since become the more popular phrase.

History
Since the 1954 Castle Bravo thermonuclear weapon test demonstrated the feasibility of making arbitrarily large nuclear devices which could cover vast areas with radioactive fallout by rendering anything around them intensely radioactive, nuclear weapons theorists such as Leo Szilard conceived of a doomsday machine, a massive thermonuclear device surrounded by hundreds of tons of cobalt which, when detonated, would create massive amounts of Cobalt-60, rendering most of the Earth too radioactive to support life. RAND strategist Herman Kahn postulated that Soviet or US nuclear decision makers might choose to build a doomsday machine that would consist of a computer linked to a stockpile of hydrogen bombs, programmed to detonate them all and bathe the planet in nuclear fallout at the signal of an impending nuclear attack from another nation.

The US and its doomsday device's theoretical ability to deter a nuclear attack is that it would go off automatically without human aid and despite human intervention. Kahn conceded that some planners might see "doomsday machines" as providing a highly credible threat that would dissuade attackers and avoid the dangerous game of brinkmanship caused by the massive retaliation concept which governed US-Soviet nuclear relations in the mid-1950s. However, in his discussion of doomsday machines, Kahn raises the problem of a nuclear-armed Nth country triggering a doomsday machine, and states that he didn't advocate that the US acquire a doomsday machine.

The Dead Hand (or "Perimeter") system built by the Soviet Union during the Cold War has been called a "doomsday machine" due to its fail-deadly design and nuclear capabilities.

In fiction 

Doomsday devices started becoming more common in science fiction in the 1940s and 1950s, due to the invention of nuclear weapons and the constant fear of total destruction. A well-known example is in the film Dr. Strangelove (1964), where a doomsday device, based on Szilard and Kahn's ideas, is triggered by an incompletely aborted American attack and all life on Earth is extinguished. Another is in the Star Trek episode The Doomsday Machine (1967), where the crew of the Enterprise fights a powerful planet-killing alien machine. However, doomsday devices also expanded to encompass many other types of fictional technology, one of the most famous of which is the Death Star, a planet-destroying, moon-sized space station.

Some works have also considered the erroneous activation of doomsday devices by external factors or chain reactions. An example of both is Virus (1980), where an earthquake is misdetected as a nuclear explosion and triggers a sequence of Automated Reaction Systems (ARS). Various types of fictional doomsday devices have also been activated as part of an AI takeover. This includes the missile launch system in the movie WarGames (1983), control of which has been handed entirely to a computer, and Skynet's nigh-destruction of the human race in The Terminator (1984).

See also

 1983 Soviet nuclear false alarm incident
 Conflict escalation
 Fail-deadly
 Global catastrophic risks
 Mutual assured destruction
 Nuclear terrorism
 Weapon of mass destruction

References

External links
 "The Return of the Doomsday Machine?", Ron Rosenbaum, Slate.com, Aug. 31, 2007
 Doomsday device featured in The Bionic Woman episode Doomsday is Tomorrow
 Channel 7 Two (Australia) - Secrets of War, Series 1, Episode 19

Nuclear weapons
Science fiction weapons